Ginásio da Portuguesa is an arena in São Paulo, Brazil.

The Ultimate Fighting Championship held the UFC Brazil event here on October 16, 1998. The attendance was 8,500.

References

Sports venues in São Paulo